The men's discus throw at the 2017 World Championships in Athletics will be held at the Olympic Stadium on .

Summary
The first throw of the final was a personal best by American Mason Finley, 67.07 metres. It only held the lead for two throwers until Andrius Gudžius threw 67.52 metres. Those held up through the round. At the start of the second round, Finley added almost another metre to his personal best, throwing 68.03 metres. The next thrower, world leader Daniel Ståhl went better throwing 69.19 metres. The next thrower was Gudžius, who edged two centimetres further with a 69.21 metres. Those three throws at the start of the second round were the medals. No other athlete came within two metres of Finley for bronze.

Records
Before the competition records were as follows:

No records were set at the competition.

Qualification standard
The standard to qualify automatically for entry was 65.00 metres.

Schedule
The event schedule, in local time (UTC+1), was as follows:

Results

Qualification
The qualification round took place on 4 August, in 2 groups, with Group A starting at 19:20 and Group B starting at 20:49.  attaining a mark of at least 64.50 metres ( Q ) or at least the 12 best performers ( q ) qualified for the final. The overall results were as follows:

Final
The final took place on 5 August at 19:27. The results were as follows:

References

Discus throw
Discus throw at the World Athletics Championships
2017 in men's athletics